Crystal Township is a civil township of Montcalm County in the U.S. state of Michigan.  As of the 2000 census, the township population was 2,824.

Communities
The first settlers in the area were lumbermen, brothers John W. and Humphrey Smith in 1853. The present community began in 1857 when Enos P. Drake built a sawmill on land he co-owned with Samuel Burtch. Asa Ward recorded a plat for the settlement and Alfred A. Proctor became the first postmaster on March 2, 1857. It is named for the nearby Crystal Lake. The Crystal post office, with ZIP code 48818, serves the northern portion of Crystal Township as well as portions of southern Ferris Township.
 Carson City is to the south, and the Carson City post office with ZIP code 48811 also serves a large part of southern Crystal Township.
 Sheridan is to the southwest, and the Sheridan post office with ZIP code 48884 also serves a small area in southwest Crystal Township.

Geography
According to the United States Census Bureau, the township has a total area of 35.8 square miles (92.8 km2), of which 34.1 square miles (88.4 km2) is land and 1.7 square miles (4.4 km2) (4.74%) is water.

Demographics
As of the census of 2000, there were 2,824 people, 1,097 households, and 770 families residing in the township. The racial makeup of the township was 97.52% White, 0.14% African American, 0.39% Native American, 0.21% Asian, 0.39% from other races, and 1.35% from two or more races. Hispanic or Latino of any race were 0.99% of the population.

There were 1,097 households, out of which 30.4% had children under the age of 18 living with them, 57.0% were married couples living together, 9.8% had a female householder with no husband present, and 29.8% were non-families. 24.0% of all households were made up of individuals, and 9.2% had someone living alone who was 65 years of age or older.  The average household size was 2.56 and the average family size was 3.02.

In the township the population was spread out, with 25.8% under the age of 18, 8.6% from 18 to 24, 26.5% from 25 to 44, 25.7% from 45 to 64, and 13.4% who were 65 years of age or older.  The median age was 38 years. For every 100 females, there were 99.3 males.  For every 100 females age 18 and over, there were 97.2 males.

The median income for a household in the township was $34,421, and the median income for a family was $41,016. Males had a median income of $31,034 versus $23,264 for females. The per capita income for the township was $17,231.  About 5.2% of families and 10.0% of the population were below the poverty line, including 9.4% of those under age 18 and 5.6% of those age 65 or over.

Points of interest
Crystal Motor Speedway
Rainbow Gardens Roller Rink - Since 1948
Crystal Lake Association - Since 1932
Crystal Congregational Church
Crystal Box Office Theater (1947)

References

Townships in Montcalm County, Michigan
Townships in Michigan